Supercell Oy is a Finnish mobile game development company based in Helsinki. Founded on 14 May 2010, the company's debut game was the browser game Gunshine.net, and after its release in 2011, Supercell started developing games for mobile devices. Since then, the company has fully released five mobile games: Hay Day, Clash of Clans, Boom Beach, Clash Royale, and Brawl Stars, which are freemium fast-paced games and have been very successful for the company, the first two generating revenue of €2 million a day in 2013.

Following its rapid growth, Supercell opened additional offices in Tokyo, Shanghai, San Francisco, and Seoul. In 2016, the company was bought out by Chinese conglomerate Tencent holdings, taking an 81.4% stake in the company valued at €8.4 billion.

Company

Business model
Supercell focuses on the development of free-to-play games that yield profits through the in-game micropayments. The company's objective is to focus on the successful games that stay popular for years. The focus has not been on revenue, but on the principle "just design something great, something that users love." Game development focuses around "cells" of five to seven people which start with idea generation and an initial review by CEO Paananen. The team subsequently develops the idea into a game, which the rest of the company's employees get to play-test, followed by play-testing in Canada's App store; if the Canada reception is good, the next step is global rollout (App Store). Successful failures are celebrated by employees. One of the games that was cancelled well into development was Battle Buddies, which had also been rated well in the test market, but the number of players was still too small. The final decision for cancelling a project is done by the development team themselves.

History

Background and founding
Before Supercell, two of its founders, Mikko Kodisoja and Ilkka Paananen, worked at Sumea, a mobile game company. Kodisoja co-founded Sumea in 1999, and Paananen was hired as the company's CEO in 2000. In 2003, Sumea made a profit of €1.2 million. In the following year, the American Digital Chocolate bought Sumea and made the company its Finnish headquarters and Paananen the European manager. Kodisoja, the firm's creative director left the company in 2010, followed soon after by Paananen.

Paananen moved to venture capital company Lifeline Ventures, but wanted to create a game company where executives would not disturb the work of the game developers. Together, Paananen, Kodisoja, Petri Styrman, Lassi Leppinen, Visa Forstén, and Niko Derome who had known each other through work connections, founded Supercell in 2010. The company started its business in the Niittykumpu district of Espoo.

Kodisoja and Paananen invested €250,000 in the company. Tekes, the Finnish funding agency for technology innovation loaned them a further €400,000 and Lifeline Ventures also invested in Supercell. The following October, Supercell raised €750,000 through seed funding, including from London Venture Partners and Initial Capital. The first game Supercell started to develop was the massive multiplayer online game Gunshine that could be played on Facebook with a browser or on mobile platforms. The game prototype was ready in eight months. After Gunshine's completion, Accel Partners also invested €8 million in the company in May 2011, and shareholder Kevin Comolli became a member of Supercell's board of directors. Accel also invested in Rovio, among others.

Change of strategies
In November 2011, Supercell abandoned Gunshine for three reasons: it did not interest players for long enough, it was too difficult to play, and the mobile version did not work as well as the browser version. At best, the game had approximately half a million players. Supercell considered Zynga's market leadership in games on the Facebook platform insurmountable and so decided to focus on iPad games, cancelling a Facebook game it was developing. In order to ease concerns of Supercell's investors due to the change of direction, Paananen increased the detail of progress reports.

The company simultaneously developed five games and the first to be released for public testing was Pets vs Orcs. This game and Tower were abandoned. In May 2012, Hay Day was published and eventually became Supercell's first internationally released game. Hay Day was Supercell's version of Zynga's successful Facebook game FarmVille, an easy-to-play farm simulator. Supercell added to their farming simulator the ability to refine products, a production chain, and touch screen properties. The social aspect of the game was emphasised as well. In four months, the game became one of the most profitable games in Apple's App Store in the US, and was one of the most profitable in the world for two and a half years. The game receives regular updates and is maintained by a team of 14 people.

Development of Clash of Clans

Lasse Louhento had started at Bloodhouse, and Lassi Leppinen was the chief programmer at Sumea and Digital Chocolate. Their team had spent months on a fantasy themed Facebook game when Supercell changed strategies. Leppinen and Louhento wanted to make a strategy game that would use a touch screen so playing would be as simple and pleasant as possible. The development of Clash of Clans took six months, and the game was released on 2 August 2012. In three months, it became the most profitable app in the US. According to App Annie, in the years 2013 and 2014 Clash of Clans was the most profitable mobile game in the world. The eponymous battle between the clans was added to the game as late as 2014.

In summer 2013, Supercell began a  marketing collaboration with the Japanese video game company GungHo: the companies cross-marketed each other's games in their own markets. As a result, Clash of Clans became one of the most downloaded apps in Japan. GungHo's chairman of the board Taizo Son flew to Finland to thank Paananen and later introduced him to his brother Masayoshi Son, the CEO of the SoftBank Corporation. Soon, they proposed a corporate acquisition which indeed happened on 7 October 2013. SoftBank and GungHo bought 51% of Supercell's shares for 1.1 billion euros which is the largest price for a Finnish private company in history. In six months, Supercell's value had tripled, since in spring 2013 the company had sold 16.7% of its shares for 100 million euros.

Development of games after Clash of Clans
Both Clash of Clans and Hay Day were released in summer 2012, and Supercell did not release a new game in almost two years. The design of the third game Boom Beach started in the autumn of 2012, and it was released in 2014. The new strategy game was released to the test market at the end of 2013, after which it went through large changes. The game was very successful in the US right after its release in March, but it did not stay at the top of the download charts for very long. However, it rose to the top 30 of the most downloaded iPhone apps after Supercell started an expensive marketing campaign in December 2014. In 2015, the game surpassed Hay Day in the charts.

In March 2016, Supercell released its fourth supported game, Clash Royale, which uses similar characters from Clash of Clans. Between the releases of Boom Beach and Clash Royale, Supercell had discontinued multiple game projects, two in their test release phase. One of them was Smash Land which had been developed by 4 to 5 people for 10 months.

In December 2018, Supercell released Brawl Stars globally, which was their fifth supported game and took 18 months to develop from its original release.

On December 15, 2021, Supercell announced that they are opening a new game studio in North America to make games for other platforms like PC and consoles.

Funding 
Accel Partners and Index Ventures invested $12 million in the Series A of Supercell in 2011. In October 2013 it was announced that the Japanese company GungHo Online Entertainment and its parent SoftBank had acquired 51% of the company for a reported $1.51 billion. On 1 June 2015, SoftBank acquired an additional 22.7% stake in Supercell, which brought their total stake to 73.2% of the company and made them the sole external shareholder. In 2016, Supercell reported annual revenues of around €2.11 billion. In three years, the company's revenues have grown a total of 800 percent, from 78.4 million (2012).

Ownership 
In June 2016, Halti S.A., a Luxembourg-based consortium founded that month, acquired 81.4% of Supercell for $8.6 billion. At the time, Japan's SoftBank valued Supercell at $10.2 billion. Halti S.A. was 50%-owned by Chinese technology company Tencent; in October 2019, Tencent increased its stake in the consortium to 51.2% by acquiring shares worth $40 million as part of a convertible bond.

Space Ape Games 
In 2017, Supercell acquired 60% of Space Ape Games, a mobile game developer based in London. In February 2021, it was announced that Space Ape will collaborate with Supercell to make Beatstar, which led to Supercell ID becoming available on Beatstar. In late 2021, Space Ape developed Boom Beach: Frontlines, a spin-off of Boom Beach with Supercell. It was soft-launched in Canada on 19 October 2021 and was released to selected countries. On 30 November 2022, the game was announced to be discontinued with servers shutting down in January 2023.

Games

Marketing 
During Super Bowl XLIX in February 2015, Supercell spent $9 million for a 60-second runtime in front of 118.5 million viewers. According to The Guardian, the Clash of Clans advertisement was one of the most popular advertisements of the 61 spots aired on NBC. The commercial, dubbed "Revenge", featured Liam Neeson parodying his character from the Taken film series by seeking revenge in a coffee shop for a random player destroying his village. The commercial has reached a total of 165 million views on the game's official YouTube channel so far, and it was the most watched commercial on YouTube in 2015. Despite the success of the commercial, Supercell has seen only a marginal increase in downloads following the advertisement. In 2020, Supercell collaborated with an animation production studio Psyop, produced a short film Lost & Crowned, was uploaded on 12 September 2020 and qualified for Oscars recognition in December.

Acknowledgements 
In 2012, Supercell was awarded as the best Nordic start-up company and chosen as the Finnish game developer of the year. The following year, Supercell won the Finnish Teknologiakasvattaja 2013 (Technology Educator 2013) contest, and the company was chosen as the software entrepreneur of the year. In 2014, the research and consultancy agency T-Media chose Supercell as Finland's most reputable company in their Luottamus&Maine (Trust&Reputation) report.

Notes

References

External links 

 

Video game companies of Finland
Video game companies established in 2010
Companies based in Helsinki
Finnish brands
Mobile game companies
Tencent
Finnish companies established in 2010
Video game development companies
2016 mergers and acquisitions